Osch and van Osch are surnames. Notable people with these surnames include:

 Alphonse Osch (1909-1997), Luxembourgish politician
 Geoffrey Osch (born 1994), Luxembourgish alpine ski racer
 Henri van Osch (1945-2001), Dutch swimmer
 Kalia Van Osch (born 1993), Canadian curler
 Kesa Van Osch (born 1991), Canadian curler
 Matthieu Osch (born 1999), Luxembourgish alpine ski racer
 Ton van Osch (born 1955), Dutch military commander
 Yanick van Osch (born 1997), Dutch footballer